A preventorium was an institution or building for patients infected with tuberculosis who did not yet have an active form of the disease. Popular in the early 20th century, preventoria were designed to isolate these patients from uninfected individuals as well as patients who showed outward symptoms. Philanthropist Nathan Straus opened the first preventorium on Preventorium Road in Lakewood, New Jersey in 1909.

See also
 Sanatorium

References

External links
 The Garrett Building: An Architectural Record of the Children’s Preventorium Movement, Rebecca Synder, University of Virginia.

Tuberculosis
Infectious diseases
Lakewood Township, New Jersey